Hijas del Tomate is the debut studio album by Las Ketchup, released in 2002. It gained popularity particularly thanks to the number-one hit "The Ketchup Song (Aserejé)". The album received a nomination for a Latin Grammy Award for Best Pop Album by a Duo or Group with Vocals in 2003.

It is considered one of the Best-Selling Latin Albums.

Reception

It met success in several countries worldwide, including Spain and Finland, where it topped the albums charts. The album earned gold and platinum certifications in several countries in America and Europe.

Track listing
 "The Ketchup Song (Aserejé)" (Spanglish version) – 3:33
 "Kusha Las Payas" – 2:46
 "Un de Vez en Cuando" – 3:33
 "Lánzame Los Trastos, Baby" – 3:24
 "Sevillanas Pink" – 3:29
 "The Ketchup Song (Aserejé)" (Hippy mix) – 3:31
 "Krapuleo" – 3:30
 "Me Persigue un Chulo" – 3:08
 "Tengo un Novio Tántriko" – 3:15
 "The Ketchup Song (Aserejé)" (Instrumental) – 3:45
 "The Ketchup Song (Aserejé)" (Spanish version) – 3:30

Charts

Weekly charts

Year-end charts

Certifications and sales

See also
 List of best-selling Latin albums

References

2002 debut albums
European Border Breakers Award-winning albums
Las Ketchup albums
Sony Music Latin albums
Spanish-language albums